This is a list of the etymology of street names and principal buildings in the London districts of Clerkenwell and Finsbury, in the London Borough of Islington. The Clerkenwell/Finsbury area has no formally defined boundaries - those used here are: Pentonville Road to the north, Goswell Road to the east, Clerkenwell Road to the south and Gray's Inn Road to the west. Finsbury was traditionally roughly the northern part of the area covered here, however in practice the name is rarely used these days.

A-F 
 Acton Street – after Acton Meadow which formerly occupied this site
 Agdon Street – after local landowners (dating back to the 17th century) the Compton family, earls and later marquises of Northampton, who owned a property called Agdon in Warwickshire
 Albemarle Way – after Elizabeth, Dowager Duchess of Albemarle, who lived at Newcastle House nearby in the 18th century
 Ampton Place and Ampton Street – after its builder the 3rd Lord Calthorpe, who owned land at Ampton, Suffolk
 Amwell Street – after the nearby New River, which starts at Great Amwell, Hertfordshire
 Archery Fields House, Wharton Street - after the historic use of the land
 Arlington Way – unknown; before 1936 called Arlington Street
 Ashby Street – after local landowners (dating back to the 17th century) the Compton family, earls and later marquises of Northampton, who had a seat at Castle Ashby, Northamptonshire
 Attneave Street – thought to be named after A Attneave, local builder in the 1890s
 Aylesbury Street – after the earl of Aylesbury, who owned a house near here in the 17th century
 Back Hill – as it lies off (or to the 'back') of a main road
 Baker’s Row and Baker’s Yard – after Richard Baker, a local 18th century carpenter
 Bath Yard
 Berry Place and Berry Street – after Thomas Berry, local early 19th century landowner
 Bevin House and Bevin Way – after prominent Labour politician Ernest Bevin
 Bowling Green Lane – after the former Bowling Green House on this site, demolished 1933. The house had been built over an old bowling green which dated back to the 18th century
 Brewhouse Yard – after a former brewery on this site
 Britannia Street – built in the 1760s and named to suggest patriotism
 Cable House, Great Percy Street - after the Cable family, agents to the Lloyd Baker estate
 Calthorpe Street – after Henry Gough-Calthorpe, 1st Baron Calthorpe, local 18th century landowner, and his descendants who developed the local street plan
 Catherine Griffiths Court – after Catherine Griffiths (1885-1988), a suffragette, founder of the Finsbury Women's Committee in the 1920s, and mayor of Finsbury in 1960
 Chadwell Street – after Chadwell Spring in Great Amwell, Hertfordshire, source of the nearby New River, or possibly William Chadwell Mylne
 Charles Rowan House, Margery Street - originally built as police housing, named after Commissioner Sir Charles Rowan 
 Claremont Close and Claremont Square – after the nearby Claremont Chapel on Pentonville Road (now the Crafts Council), which was named after Claremont, Surrey, the country house of the then-recently deceased Princess Charlotte of Wales
 Clerkenwell Close, Clerkenwell Green and Clerkenwell Road – from a local well (‘the clerk’s well), which gave its name to the area
 Coldbath Square – after a former cold spring on this site that was used for medicinal purposes in the 17th – 18th centuries
 Coley Street - after Henry Coley, 17th century mathematician, who lived on Grays Inn Road
 Compton Passage and Compton Street – after local landowners (dating back to the 17th century) the Compton family, earls and later marquises of Northampton
 Corporation Row – after the former New Corporation Work House, built here in the 1660s; prior to this it was known as Cut Throat Lane
 Crawford Passage – after Peter Crawford, landlord of a former pub here called the Pickled Egg; the passage was formerly Pickled Egg Walk
 Cruickshank Street – after George Cruikshank, 19th century illustrator who lived on nearby Amwell Street
 Cubitt Street – after the prominent 19th century builder Thomas Cubitt, who built this street; it was formerly called Arthur Street
 Cumberland Gardens – probably in honour of the Duke of Cumberland; prior to 1929 this was Cumberland Terrace
 Cyrus Street – possibly after the Persian King of this name; prior to 1880 it was called King Street
 Dabbs Lane
 Dallington Street – after Robert Dallington, master of the Charterhouse in the 1620s
 Earlom House, Fernsbury Street - named after the artist Richard Earlom 
 Earlstoke Street – corruption of Erlestoke: local landowner Charles Compton, 1st Marquess of Northampton married in 1787 Maria Smith, daughter of Joshua Smith MP, of Erlestoke Park, Wiltshire
 Easton Street – after local landowners (dating back to the 17th century) the Compton family, earls and later marquises of Northampton, who owned property in Easton Maudit, Northamptonshire
 Edward Rudolf House - named after Edward Rudolf, founder of the Children's Society, whose head office was formerly here 
 Elm Street – possibly for the former elm trees located here
 Exmouth Market – after Edward Pellew, 1st Viscount Exmouth, prominent 18th – 19th century naval officer
 Eyre Street Hill – unknown; formerly called Little Bath Street
 Farringdon Lane and Farringdon Road – from Sir William or Nicholas de Farnedon/Faringdon, local sheriffs or aldermen in the 13th century
 Fernsbury Street – named in 1912 after an early variant of ‘Finsbury’, former name for this area
 Field Street – built over Battle Bridge Field, or possibly after Peter Field, early 19th century builder
 Fleet Square – presumably as the river Fleet flowed near here
 Frederick Street – after local landowners the Barons Calthorpe, the 4th and 5th of whom were called Frederick
 Friend Street – after George Friend, local scarlet-dyer who founded a free clinic nearby in 1780

G-L 
 Garnault Mews and Garnault Street – after Samuel Garnault, 18th century treasurer of the New River Company
 Gloucester Way – after Thomas Lloyd Baker, local landowner, who also owned Hardwicke Court in Gloucester
 Goswell Place and Goswell Road – there is dispute over the origins of the name, with some sources claiming the road was named after a nearby garden called 'Goswelle' or 'Goderell' which belonged to Robert de Ufford, 1st Earl of Suffolk, whilst others state it derives from "God's Well", and the traditional pagan practice of well-worship. or else a former 'Gode Well' located here
 Gough Street – after Richard Gough, wool merchant and local landowner in the early 18th century
 Granville Square and Granville Street – after Granville Sharp, notable opponent of the slave trade; he was the uncle of Mary Sharp, who married local landowner Thomas Lloyd Baker
 Gray's Inn Road – from Lord Gray of Wilton, owner of a local inn or town house which was later leased to lawyers in the 16th century
 Great Sutton Street and Sutton Lane – after Thomas Sutton, who founded the nearby Charterhouse School in 1611
 Green Terrace and Green Yard – possibly after the adjacent Spa Green, or instead John Grene, Clerk to the New River Company in the late 1600s
 Greenaway House, Fernsbury Street - after the illustrator Kate Greenaway who studied at Finsbury School of Art 
 Gwynne Place and Gwynne House, Margery Street – after Nell Gwynne, mistress of Charles II, who lived near here
 Hardwick Mews and Hardwick Street – after Thomas Lloyd Baker, local landowner, who also owned Hardwicke Court in Gloucester
 Hayward’s Place – after James Hayward, local 19th century landowner and ironmonger
 Herbal Hill and Herbal Place – after a former herb garden near here belonging to the Bishops of Ely, former local landowners
 Hermit Street – after a hermitage established here in 1511 by the Monastic Order of the Knights Hospitallers of St John of Jerusalem
 Holford Mews, Holdford Place and Holford Street – after the Holford family, who worked on the New River) scheme in the 18th century
 Holsworthy Square – 
 Ingle Mews and Inglebert Street – after William Inglebert, 17th century engineer who worked on the New River scheme
 Jerusalem Passage – after the Monastic Order of the Knights Hospitallers of St John of Jerusalem
 Joseph Trotter House - after a former Mayor of Finsbury
 King’s Cross Bridge and Kings Cross Road – after a former statue of George IV that formerly stood near where the train station is now; the Road was formerly called Bagnigge Wells, after a tea garden of that name near here
 Langton Close – after the Arthur Langton Nurses Home formerly located here
 Laystall Street – after a former nearby laystall, a term for a refuse heap
 Leeke Street
 Leo Yard – from the Latin for lion, as it was formerly Red Lion Yard
 Lloyd’s Row, Lloyd Square, Lloyd Street and Lloyd Baker Street – after the Lloyd Baker family, local 19th century landowners
 Lorenzo Street – unknown; formerly York Street

M-R 
 Malta Street – unknown, though probably by association with the nearby Monastic Order of the Knights Hospitallers of St John of Jerusalem (also Knights of Malta); formerly Queen Street
 Manningford Close
 Margery Street – after a family member of local landowners (dating back to the 17th century) the Compton family, earls and later marquises of Northampton; it was formerly Margaret Street
 Meredith Street – after John Meredith, local landowner and member of the Worshipful Company of Skinners, who owned much of the surrounding land
 Merlin Street – after a former local pub, the New Merlin’s Cave after a local landowner of this name
 Michael Cliffe House, Skinner Street - after a former Mayor of Finsbury
 Mount Pleasant – ironically named after a former nearby refuse tip
 Myddelton Passage, Myddelton Square and Myddelton Street – after Hugh Myddleton, who devised the New River scheme in the early 17th century
 Mylne Street – after Robert Mylne, who did much engineering work for the New River Company, as did his son William Chadwell Mylne
 Naoroji Street – after Dadabhai Naoroji, who was active in local politics in the late 19th century
 Newcastle Row – after Newcastle House, which formerly stood here; the house was named after its 17th century owner William Cavendish, Duke of Newcastle
 Northampton Road, Northampton Row and Northampton Square – after local landowners (dating back to the 17th century) the Compton family, earls and later marquises of Northampton
 Northburgh Street – after Michael de Northburgh, a bishop who founded the nearby Charterhouse monastery in 1371
 Owen Street and Owen’s Row – after Dame Alice Owen, who founded almshouses near here in 1609
 Paget Street – after Sir James Paget, 19th century surgeon, who had a clinic on nearby Friend Street
 Pakenham Street – after its builder the 3rd Lord Calthorpe, who owned land at Pakenham, Suffolk
 Pardon Street – after the Pardon Chapel which stood near here in the Middle Ages
 Pear Tree Court – thought to be from a local pear tree
 Penton Rise and Pentonville Road – after Henry Penton, who developed this area in the late 18th century
 Percival Street – after local landowners (dating back to the 17th century) the Compton family, earls and later marquises of Northampton, one of whom was a cousin of Spencer Perceval
 Percy Circus, Percy Yard and Great Percy Street – after Robert Percy Smith, 19th century MP who was a director of the New River Company
 Peter Benenson House, Easton Street - named after Peter Benenson, the founder of Amnesty International who have their International Secretariat there: formerly the Coates printing ink factory 
 Phoenix Place and Phoenix Yard – after the former Phoenix Iron Foundry near here
 Pine Street – Wood Street prior to 1877, probably both names after an avenue of tree that formerly stood here, or possibly after Thomas Wood, 18th century leaseholder
 Poole’s Buildings
 Prideaux Place – after Arthur R Prideaux, 19th century director of the New River Company
 Rawstorne Place and Rawstorne Street – after local 18th century bricklayer Thomas Rawstorne
 Ray Street and Ray Street Bridge – corruption of ‘Rag’, after the former local rag trade here; the streets was formerly two different streets – Hockley in the Hole and Town’s End Lane
 Riceyman House, Fernsbury Street - named after the novel Riceyman Steps set nearby 
 River Passage, River Street and River Street Mews – after the nearby New River
 Robert's Place – probably after Richard Roberts, who built much of the local area in the 1800s
 Rosebery Avenue and Rosebery Square – after Archibald Primrose, 5th Earl of Rosebery, 19th century Prime Minister; he was chairman of the London County Council when this street was built in 1889
 Rosoman Place – after Thomas Rosoman, first manager of the nearby Sadler’s Wells Theatre in the 18th century

S-Z 
 Sage Way
 St Chad’s Place – after the nearby St Chad’s well, reputed to be a medieval holy well; St Chad was a 7th-century bishop
 St Helena Street – believed to be named after St Helena, in commemoration of Napoleon’s exile there in 1815
 St James’s Walk – after the adjacent St James's Church, Clerkenwell
 St John Street and St John’s Square – after the Monastic Order of the Knights Hospitallers of St John of Jerusalem, who set up their English headquarters here in the 12th century
 St Philip's House, Margery Street - named after St Philip's Church, Granville Square 
 Sanders House, Great Percy Street - named after C S Sanders, surveyor of the New River Company
 Sans Walk – after Edward Sans, named in 1893 as he was then oldest member of the local parish vestry
 Scotswood Street
 Sebastian Street – after Lewis Sebastian, former Master of the Worshipful Company of Skinners and chairman of the governors of Northampton Polytechnic (now City University)
 Seddon Street – after the Seddon brothers, local merchants and landowners
 Sekforde Street – after Thomas Seckford, Elizabethan court official, who left land nearby in his will for the building of an almshouse
 Sherston Court
 Skinner Street – after the Worshipful Company of Skinners, who owned much of the surrounding land when the street was built in the 1810s
 Soley Mews
 Spafield Street and the Spa Fields estate – after a former spa on this site which closed in 1776 
 Spencer Street – after local landowners (dating back to the 17th century) the Compton family, earls and later marquises of Northampton, one of whom was cousins with Spencer Perceval
 Summers Street
 Swinton Place and Swinton Street – after local 18th century landowner James Swinton
 Tompion Street – after 17th century clockmaker Thomas Tompion; formerly called Smith Street
 Topham Street – after local strongman Topham the Strong Man, who performed feats of strength here in the 18th century
 Tysoe Street – after local landowners (dating back to the 17th century) the Compton family, earls and later marquises of Northampton, who owned land at Tysoe in Northamptonshire 
 Vernon Rise and Vernon Square – after Robert Vernon, 1st Baron Lyveden, 19th century director of the New River Company
 Vine Hill and Vine Street Bridge – after the vineyards owned by the Bishops of Ely formerly located here
 Vineyard Walk – after a former 18th century vineyard on this site
 Warner Street and Warner Yard – after Robert Warner, local 18th century landowner
 Wells Square - after the former Wells Street which led to Bagnigge Wells spa
 Weston Rise – after John Weston, who built this road in the 1790s
 Wharton Street – after Philip Wharton, 4th Baron Wharton, who had a home in Clerkenwell Close in the mid 17th century
 Whiskin Way – after John Whiskin, local landowner/builder in the 19th century
 White Bear Yard - possibly after a former inn
 Wicklow Street – possibly from Wicklow in Ireland
 William Martin Court - named after a local Alderman 
 Wilmington Square and Wilmington Street – after local landowners (dating back to the 17th century) the Compton family, earls and later marquesses of Northampton, who also had the title Baron Wilmington 
 Woodbridge Street – after Thomas Seckford, Elizabethan court official, who left land nearby in his will for the building of an almshouse; Sekford was born in Woodbridge, Suffolk
 Wren Street – after prominent architect Sir Christopher Wren
 Wyclif Street – after John Wycliffe, noted 14th century religious reformer; by association with the former nearby Smithfield Martyrs’ Memorial Church
 Wynyatt Street – corruption of ‘Wynyates’; after local landowners (dating back to the 17th century) the Compton family, earls and later marquises of Northampton, who owned land at Compton Wynyates in Northamptonshire
 Yardley Street – after local landowners (dating back to the 17th century) the Compton family, earls and later marquises of Northampton, one of whom was born at Yardley Hastings, Northamptonshire

References

Sources

Streets in the London Borough of Islington
Lists of United Kingdom placename etymology
Clerkenwell
Clerkenwell
England geography-related lists